Lydia Davis (born July 15, 1947) is an American short story writer, novelist, essayist, and translator from French and other languages, who often writes short (one or two pages long) short stories. Davis has produced several new translations of French literary classics, including Swann's Way by Marcel Proust and Madame Bovary by Gustave Flaubert.

Early life and education
Davis was born in Northampton, Massachusetts, on July 15, 1947. She is the daughter of Robert Gorham Davis, a critic and professor of English, 
and Hope Hale Davis, a short-story writer, teacher, and memoirist. Davis initially "studied music—first piano, then violin—which was her first love." On becoming a writer, Davis has said, "I was probably always headed to being a writer, even though that wasn't my first love. I guess I must have always wanted to write in some part of me or I wouldn't have done it." She attended high school at The Putney School, Class of 1965. She studied at Barnard College, and at that time she mostly wrote poetry.

In 1974 Davis married Paul Auster, with whom she had a son named Daniel (1977-2022). Auster and Davis later divorced; Davis is now married to the artist Alan Cote, with whom she has another son, Theo Cote. 
She is a professor of creative writing at the University at Albany, SUNY, and was a Lillian Vernon Distinguished Writer-in-Residence at New York University in 2012.

Career
Davis has published six collections of fiction, including The Thirteenth Woman and Other Stories (1976) and Break It Down (1986), a finalist for the PEN/Hemingway Award. Her most recent collections were Varieties of Disturbance, a finalist for the National Book Award published by Farrar, Straus and Giroux in 2007, and Can't and Won't (2013). The Collected Stories of Lydia Davis (2009) contains all her fiction up to 2008.

Davis has also translated Proust, Flaubert, Blanchot, Foucault, Michel Butor, Michel Leiris, Pierre Jean Jouve and other French writers, as well as Belgian novelist Conrad Detrez and the Dutch writer A.L. Snijders.

Reception and influence

Davis has been described as "the master of a literary form largely of her own invention." Some of her "stories" are only one or two sentences. Davis has compared these works to skyscrapers in the sense that they are surrounded by an imposing blank expanse. Michael LaPointe writing in the LA Review of Books goes so far as to say while "Lydia Davis did not invent flash fiction, ... she is so far and away its most eminent contemporary practitioner". Her "distinctive voice has never been easy to fit into conventional categories", writes Kasia Boddy in the Columbia Companion to the 21st Century Short Story. Boddy writes: "Davis's parables are most successful when they examine the problems of communication between men and women, and the strategies each uses to interpret the other's words and actions." Of contemporary authors, only Davis, Stuart Dybek, and Alice Fulton share the distinction of appearing in both The Best American Short Stories and The Best American Poetry series.

In October 2003, Davis received a MacArthur Fellowship. She was elected a fellow of the American Academy of Arts and Sciences in 2005. Davis was a distinguished speaker at the 2004 &NOW Festival at the University of Notre Dame. Davis was announced as the winner of the 2013 Man Booker International Prize on 22 May 2013. The official announcement of Davis' award on the Man Booker Prize website described her work as having "the brevity and precision of poetry". The judging panel chair Christopher Ricks commented that "[t]here is vigilance to her stories, and great imaginative attention. Vigilance as how to realise things down to the very word or syllable; vigilance as to everybody's impure motives and illusions of feeling."  Davis won £60,000 as part of the biennial award. She is widely considered "one of the most original minds in American fiction today."

Awards
 1986 PEN/Hemingway Award finalist, for Break It Down
 1988 Whiting Award for Fiction
 "St. Martin," a short story that first appeared in Grand Street, was included in The Best American Short Stories 1997.
 1997 Guggenheim Fellowship
 1998 Lannan Literary Award for Fiction
 1999 Chevalier de l'Ordre des Arts et des Lettres for fiction and translation.
 "Betrayal," a short-short story that first appeared in Hambone, was included in The Best American Poetry 1999
 "A Mown Lawn," a short-short-story that first appeared in McSweeney's, was included in The Best American Poetry 2001
 2003 MacArthur Fellows Program
 2007 National Book Award Fiction finalist, for Varieties of Disturbance: Stories
 "Men," a short-short story that first appeared in 32 Poems, was included in The Best American Poetry 2008
 2013 American Academy of Arts and Letters' Award of Merit Medal
 2013 Philolexian Society Award for Distinguished Literary Achievement
 2013 Man Booker International Prize
 2020 PEN/Malamud Award

Selected works
The Thirteenth Woman and Other Stories, Living Hand, 1976

 (novel)

Lydia Davis: Documenta Series 078. Hatje Cantz. 2012.

Anthologies

Translations
 
 
 
 
   (Davis translated the 19-page afterword by Maurice Blanchot, "Joubert et l'espace.")
Michel Butor (1986). The Spirit of Mediterranean Places. Translator Lydia Davis. Marlboro Press.

References

Further reading
Evans, Jonathan, The Many Voices of Lydia Davis: Translation, Rewriting, and Intertextuality, Edinburgh: Edinburgh University Press, 2016.

External links
Finding aid to Lydia Davis papers at Columbia University. Rare Book & Manuscript Library.

 "Fear" and four other stories, Conjunctions, http://www.conjunctions.com/print/article/lydia-davis-c24

"Negative Emotions." Coffin Factory (short story)
The Believer interview with Sarah Manguso
Samuel Johnson Is Indignant – TMO Meets Lydia Davis
BOMB interview with Francine Prose
Gigantic interview with James Yeh
"Q&A with Lydia Davis", The Boston Globe, Kate Bolick, April 29, 2007
"2007 National Book Award Fiction Finalist Interview With Lydia Davis", National Book Foundation
"Structure Is Structure", Poetry Foundation
"A Conversation with Lydia Davis", Web Del Sol
Audio-files @ PENNsound listen to Lydia Davis read from her work
Author Page at Internationales Literatufestival Berlin Davis was a Guest of the ILB ( Internationales Literatufestival Berlin / Germany   ) in 2001
"Lydia Davis", Penn Sound
Lydia Davis: Reading 'Goodbye Louise' Video by Louisiana Channel
Profile at The Whiting Foundation
 MacArthur Foundation
 SUNY Albany
 Lannan Foundation
 Kelly House Writers
 New Yorker - Long Story Short
 MacMillan Publishers
 Penguin Random House
 Encyclopedia Britannica
 Poetry Foundation

1947 births
Living people
20th-century American novelists
20th-century American short story writers
21st-century American short story writers
American women short story writers
American short story writers
American translators
MacArthur Fellows
University at Albany, SUNY faculty
Place of birth missing (living people)
Fellows of the American Academy of Arts and Sciences
Translators of Marcel Proust
French–English translators
Novelists from Massachusetts
Barnard College alumni
American women novelists
20th-century French women writers
20th-century translators
International Booker Prize winners
21st-century American women writers